The 2010 FIM PGE Polska Grupa Energetyczna Speedway World Cup Event 1 was the first race of the 2010 Speedway World Cup season. It took place on 25 July 2010 at the Edward Jancarz Stadium in Gorzów Wielkopolski, Poland.

It was scheduled to take place on July  24. However, the meeting was delay because the track was deemed unsuitable by the FIM Jury due to adverse weather conditions. The event was re-staged on the next day at 3pm.

Results 

The event was dominated by host team and the defending champion Poland team who scored 68 points in 25 heats - the highest score ever recorded in the competition for a four-team event (since the 2004 Speedway World Cup). Denmark (45 points, without injury former three-time World Champion Nicki Pedersen) and Russia (31 points, without injury star Emil Sayfutdinov) goes into the Race-off. Czech Republic (only 8 points) were knocked out of the competition.

It was the Speedway World Cup debut for two riders: Artem Laguta of Russia (8 pts), and Martin Málek of Czech Republic (0 pts).

Heat details

Heat after heat 
 [64,28] Bjerre, Hampel, A.Laguta, L.Dryml (X)
 [64,21] Holta, Gafurov, Iversen, A.Dryml
 [65,12] Gollob, Andersen, G.Laguta, Málek
 [65,40] Klindt, Miedziński, Gizatulin, Simota
 [64,44] Kołodziej, Pedersen, Povazhny, Kůs
 [64,93] A.Laguta, Kołodziej, Andersen, Simota
 [64,91] Hampel, Kůs, Gafurov, Klindt
 [64,92] Holta, Pedersen, L.Dryml, G.Laguta
 [64,94] Gollob, A.Dryml, Gizatulin, Bjerre
 [64,69] Miedziński, Povazhny, Iversen, Málek
 [65,50] A.Laguta, Holta, Klindt, Málek
 [65,18] Bjarne Pedersen, Gollob, Gafurov, Simota
 [64,96] Miedziński, Bjerre (J), Kůs, G.Laguta
 [64,79] Kołodziej, Iversen, L.Dryml, Gizatulin (Fx)
 [64,60] Hampel, Andersen, Povazhny, A.Dryml
 [65,56] Gollob, Iversen, Kůs, A.Laguta (J)
 [65,25] Andersen, Gafurov, Miedziński, L.Dryml
 [65,31] Kołodziej, Klindt, G.Laguta, A.Dryml
 [65,00] Hampel, Pedersen, Gizatulin, L.Dryml (TS) (R)
 [65,28] Holta, Povazhny, Bjerre, Simota
 [65,72] Miedziński, Pedersen, A.Laguta, A.Dryml
 [65,38] Kołodziej, Bjerre, Gafurov, Málek
 [65,09] Hampel, G.Laguta, Iversen, Simota
 [65,16] Holta, Andersen, Gizatulin, Kůs (J)
 [65,00] Gollob, Povazhny, Klindt, L.Dryml

See also 
 2010 Speedway World Cup
 motorcycle speedway

References 

E1